Adrian Hall (born 1 January 1959) is an English former actor and co-director. He is best known for the film Chitty Chitty Bang Bang (1968), in which he portrayed the part of Jeremy Potts. He was later Principal of the Academy of Live and Recorded Arts (ALRA) until he resigned in 2021 following racism accusations. The academy closed in 2022.

Filmography

References

External links
 
 

1959 births
Living people
20th-century English male actors
21st-century English male actors
English male child actors
English male film actors
People from Staines-upon-Thames